Göring redirects to Hermann Göring (eng. "Hermann Goering"), a leading member of the Nazi Party.

Göring may also refer to:
Göring (surname)
Fallschirm-Panzergrenadier Division 2 Hermann Göring, a division formed in the area of Radom
Fallschirm-Panzer Division 1 Hermann Göring, a Luftwaffe armoured division

See also
Goering (disambiguation)
Goring (disambiguation)
Carl Göring, a 19th century German academic, philosopher and chess master
Göring Attack, a chess line in the Evans Gambit
Göring Gambit, a chess line in the Scotch Game
Göring Variant, a chess line in the Two Knights Game